Tobias Walter is a German field hockey player who plays as a goalkeeper for Belgian club Braxgata. He played a total of 58 matches for the German national team from 2015 to 2019.

Club career
Walter started playing hockey at Frankenthal and in 2007 he switched to Dürkheimer HC, who he left in 2009 for Mannheimer HC. He moved to Harvestehude in 2012. After six seasons with Harvestehude, he moved to Belgium to play for Dragons in Brasschaat. After three seasons he left Dragons to play for Braxgata. There he is a coach for the U16G1.

International career
Walter made his debut for the senior national team in March 2015 in a test match against Great Britain. In December 2018, he was nominated for the FIH Goalkeeper of the Year Award.

References

External links

1990 births
Living people
Male field hockey goalkeepers
German male field hockey players
2018 Men's Hockey World Cup players
Mannheimer HC players
Harvestehuder THC players
KHC Dragons players
Men's Belgian Hockey League players
Expatriate field hockey players
German expatriate sportspeople in Belgium
Place of birth missing (living people)
Men's Feldhockey Bundesliga players
21st-century German people